Marion Glenn Broadstone (June 24, 1906 – April 10, 1972) was an American football tackle who played one season with the New York Giants of the National Football League. He played college football at the University of Nebraska–Lincoln and attended Norfolk High School in Norfolk, Nebraska.

References

External links
Just Sports Stats

1906 births
1972 deaths
Players of American football from Nebraska
American football tackles
Nebraska Cornhuskers football players
New York Giants players
People from Pender, Nebraska